Craspedia may refer to:

 Craspedia (fly), a genus of flies in the family Asilidae
 Craspedia (plant), a genus of plants in the family Asteraceae 
 Craspedia (moth), a genus of moths in the family Geometridae, now placed in the genus Scopula